Gualberto Mojica Olmos (born 7 October 1984) is a Bolivian former footballer and a manager.

Club career
Mojica was one of the most promising prospects of the largely awarded Tahuichi Academy's class of '84. After an impressive performance in the Gothia Cup, winning the title with Tahuichi in 2001, he awoke the interest of Wilstermann, club for which he later signed in May 2001. After two years playing in Cochabamba, he was transferred to Blooming where his career took off.

At Blooming he soon became the team captain and one of the most notable players in the Bolivian League. In 2005, Mojica had a remarkable season; his great performances helped the team win its fourth national championship.

Following his successful spell with Blooming, he transferred to Romanian club CFR Cluj before moving to Portuguese side F.C. Paços de Ferreira not long after. From the beginning he struggled to gain a consistent first-team place, making only 15 league appearances combined during his European journey.

After a disappointing season overseas, he returned to Bolivia in January 2008, and again, signed with Blooming for a year. When the contract expired, Mojica demanded a considerable raise of salary and the club decided to dispense with his services. Thus, Mojica signed with local rival team Oriente Petrolero in January 2009. After a year with Oriente, Mojica returned to Blooming for his third stint.

In February 2013, Mojica returned to Romania, where he signed a contract for one-and-a-half-year with Petrolul Ploiești.

On 4 July 2013, he moved to China and signed a contract with China League One side Chongqing Lifan.

International career
Mojica was the captain of the Bolivian Under-23 national team. In addition, he has been capped for the senior Bolivia national team on 31 occasions. He represented his country in 10 FIFA World Cup qualification matches.

Honours
Blooming
 Primera División (1): 2005
 Copa Aerosur (2): 2006, 2008
Petrolul Ploiesti
Cupa României (1): 2012–13

References

External links

1984 births
Living people
Sportspeople from Santa Cruz de la Sierra
Association football midfielders
Bolivian footballers
Bolivia international footballers
2007 Copa América players
C.D. Jorge Wilstermann players
Club Blooming players
CFR Cluj players
F.C. Paços de Ferreira players
Oriente Petrolero players
FC Petrolul Ploiești players
Chongqing Liangjiang Athletic F.C. players
Hajer FC players
Bolivian Primera División players
Liga I players
China League One players
Primeira Liga players
Saudi Professional League players
Bolivian football managers
Bolivian expatriate footballers
Expatriate footballers in Romania
Expatriate footballers in Portugal
Expatriate footballers in China
Expatriate footballers in Saudi Arabia
Bolivian expatriate sportspeople in Romania
Bolivian expatriate sportspeople in Portugal